Adria is an unincorporated community in Tazewell County, Virginia, United States.

References

Unincorporated communities in Tazewell County, Virginia
Unincorporated communities in Virginia